The 2008 Washington State House elections took place on November 4, 2008. Voters in all 49 of Washington's legislative districts voted for their representatives.  Washington State Senate elections were also held on November 4.

Overview

Election results

District 1

District 2

District 3

District 4

District 5

District 6

District 7
Incumbent Representative Bob Sump retired.

District 8

District 9

District 10

District 11

District 12

District 13

District 14

District 15

District 16

District 17
Representative Jim Dunn is retiring.

District 18
Incumbent Representative Richard Curtis is retiring.

District 19

District 20

District 21

District 22

District 23

District 24

District 25
Incumbent Representative Joyce McDonald is retiring.

District 26
Incumbent Representative Patricia Lantz is retiring.

District 27

District 28

District 29

District 30

District 31

District 32

District 33
Representative Shay Schual-Berke is retiring.

District 34

District 35

Representative William "Ike" Eickmeyer is retiring.

District 36
Representative Helen Sommers is retiring.

District 37

District 38

District 39

District 40

District 41

District 42

District 43

District 44

District 45

District 46
Representative Jim McIntire is running for State Treasurer.

District 47

District 48

District 49

References

2008 Washington (state) elections
Washington House of Representatives elections
Washington House